VITAS® Healthcare is a provider of end-of-life care in the United States. Operating 50 hospice programs in 14 states and the District of Columbia, VITAS employs 10,000 professionals and serves an average daily census of more than 17,000 patients, according to the company's website.

VITAS is a subsidiary of publicly traded Chemed Corporation, which also owns plumbing company Roto-Rooter.

Company overview 

VITAS (pronounced VEE-tahs) offers hospice and palliative care services to patients across the U.S., provided by its doctors, registered nurses, home health aides, social workers, clergy, and volunteers. With more than 40 years of experience in hospice care, it is the nation's largest single-source provider of end-of-life care and works in cooperation with hospitals, physicians, nursing homes, assisted living communities, insurers, and community-based organizations throughout the U.S.

The organization also supplies home medical equipment and medications to patients while offering spiritual and emotional counseling to patients and their families. 

The name VITAS is derived from the Latin word for "lives."

History 
VITAS began in 1978 as a nonprofit hospice in South Florida, founded in part by Hugh Westbrook, a Methodist minister, and Esther Colliflower, a nurse.

Their first patient was Emmy Philhour. The organization then became known as Hospice Care, Incorporated, and eventually, VITAS Healthcare.

In 1979, Florida became the first state to have a hospice licensure law. Westbrook and another VITAS founder, Don Gaetz, played a crucial role in passing the Hospice Care Reimbursement Act in 1982 that made hospice a Medicare benefit.

In 2004, VITAS was acquired by Cincinnati-based Chemed for $400 million. Timothy S. O'Toole served as Chief Executive Officer from 2004 when Chemed purchased VITAS until his retirement in June 2016 and Nick Westfall was named CEO.

Healthcare technology 
In April 2015, VITAS was part of a technology roll-out with HealthGrid that enables clinicians to exchange critical patient-care data quickly and securely with other care providers. The same technology helps healthcare providers meet one rule of CMS Meaningful Use Phase 2, which states that data for 10 percent of patients must be transmitted electronically.

Using AirWatch technology on tablets, VITAS employees can access information and media that help patients and families make decisions about end-of-life care.

VITAS provides clinicians with a native mobile app that helps them identify hospice-appropriate patients and begin the admissions process from their smart phones.

Department of Justice lawsuit 
In 2013, the U.S. Department of Justice filed a lawsuit against Chemed Corporation, Vitas Hospice Services LLC, and Vitas Healthcare Corporation for the submission of false claims from 2002 through 2013. "The government’s complaint alleges that Chemed and Vitas Hospice knowingly submitted or caused the submission of false claims to Medicare for crisis care services that were not necessary, not actually provided, or not performed in accordance with Medicare requirements." In 2017, the organization agreed to pay $75 million to settle the lawsuit. Acting Assistant Attorney General Chad A. Readler of the Justice Department's Civil Division stated that the "resolution represents the largest amount ever recovered under the False Claims Act from a provider of hospice services."

Corporate headquarters 

VITAS Healthcare is headquartered in Miami, Florida. In 2013, the organization leased 23,500 square feet at the Miami Center, which is located at 201 South Biscayne Boulevard.

Previously, VITAS was an anchor tenant at Bayfront Plaza at 100 South Biscayne Boulevard, which bears the VITAS name. Bayfront Plaza, completed in the late 1950s, is expected to be demolished and replaced by One Bayfront Plaza in 2018, a large complex which would be among the tallest buildings in Miami.

References 

Hospices in the United States
Medical and health organizations based in Florida
Palliative care in the United States